Tom Grahame was an Australian rugby league footballer who played in the 1930s.  He played for Balmain in the NSWRL Competition and Castleford (Heritage № 285).

Playing career
Grahame made his first grade debut for Balmain against Western Suburbs in Round 1 1934 at the Leichhardt Oval.   

Grahame missed the entire 1935 season but returned to the side in 1936.  Grahame played at halfback in the 1936 NSWRL grand final against Eastern Suburbs.  Balmain went into the game as the underdogs and were soundly beaten by Easts 32–12.

This would be the last game that Grahame would play for the club.  At representative level, Grahame played 4 times for NSW Country between 1933 and 1937.

References

Australian rugby league players
Balmain Tigers players
Castleford Tigers players
Country New South Wales Origin rugby league team players
Rugby league players from Sydney
Rugby league halfbacks
Year of birth missing
Year of death missing
Place of birth missing
Place of death missing